Zina Roscoe Carter was an American businessman and politician who served as the president of the Sanitary District of Chicago Board of Trustees as well as a Chicago alderman. He was the unsuccessful Republican Party nominee for mayor of Chicago in 1899. He also served as president of the Chicago Board of Trade for the year 1898.

Early life and family
Carter was born and raised on a farm in Wheaton, Illinois.

Carter had four siblings, Orrin, Alpheus, Benajah, and Armada.

Business career
Carter moved to Chicago in 1871. There, he founded the Z. R. Carter and Bro. feed and flour business.

Carter was a member of the Chicago Board of Trade for nearly four decades. He served as its president in 1898.

Political career

Chicago alderman
In 1895, Carter was elected a member of the Chicago City Council from the tenth ward.

Sanitary District of Chicago board of trustees
Having been elected to the Sanitary District of Chicago board of trustees in the November 1895 election, Carter resigned from the Chicago City Council in January 1896 to assume his new office.

In 1899, Carter was the Republican Party's nominee for mayor of Chicago. He lost the election to Carter Harrison Jr.

In November 1903, an agreement was reached that the board would elect Carter would be voted by the board as its president on December 8, 1903.

Carter ended his tenure on the board in 1905.

Death
After a brief illness, Carter died at the age of 75 on April 19, 1922 at Chicago's Columbus hospital.

References

Chicago City Council members
Illinois Republicans
1922 deaths
People from Wheaton, Illinois
Chicago Board of Trade
Businesspeople from Chicago